Ouâbi; or, The Virtues of Nature: An Indian Tale in Four Cantos is a narrative poem by Sarah Wentworth Morton that tells the tale of a love triangle between two American Indians and one white man. The narrative is one of the first works to use Native American or "Indian" themes in American verse. Morton included many notes about contemporary understandings of Indian councils, war feasts, the Mississippi River, marriage ceremonies, and beliefs about revenge.

Background 

Ouâbi is written in the form of a narrative poem in four parts. Sarah Wentworth Morton had it published in 1790 under the pen name Philenia. The work is the first of its kind with an American Indian hero.

Plot summary
The narrative poem tells the story of a woman, Azâkia, belonging to the Illinois Indian Tribe. Azâkia is first introduced to the reader while a man from the rival Huron Tribe is attempting to rape her. Azâkia is then rescued by a white man, Celario, which spurs a love triangle between Celario, Azâkia, and her husband, Ouâbi. This triangle is not only of love, but also of friendship, as Ouâbi and Celario actually generate a very good friendship.

Celario lusts after Azâkia, and she has feelings for him, but she knows she must stay loyal to her husband, Ouâbi. The Illinois sachem allows Celario to go to war with him, to prove himself worthy of his wife, Azâkia. Celario is injured in battle and sent back to the settlement with Azâkia. Ultimately, Ouâbi realizes that the love Celario has for Azâkia is unmatched by the love he has for her. Ouâbi relinquishes his "marriage" to Azâkia so she and Celario can be together as was truly meant to be.

Analysis

The tale resembles the story of her own life with her spouse, Perez Morton, and sister, Frances. The two stories ends in exactly the same fashion, suicide. In real life, Frances commits suicide because what she has done is wrong. In her narrative poem, the great Illinois sachem Ouâbi allows himself to die so that Celario and Azâkia may be together. While the suicides differentiate slightly, they both are performed in order to allow partners to be together as they should be. Ouâbi makes this virtuous suicide look more like a long-standing tradition in the tribe rather than something imported from elsewhere. Suicide is truly the most interesting aspect of the narrative poem. All three main characters take their turn offering their lives for one another. Celario goes to war for Ouâbi, offering his life for him and Azâkia at the same time. Ouâbi then dies for Celario and Azâkia so they can be together. Lastly, Azâkia, overcome with the sadness Ouâbi's death considers killing herself for him, and the only reason she restrains is because she promised Celario she would not act so drastically. These life offerings show suicide is proof of natural virtue, and a presumably nonaggressive for the white man to win.

Other intriguing concepts in ‘’Ouâbi’’ are the ideas of homosocial relationships and gender differentiations in Indian culture. The fact that Celario was banished from his people because of a duel gone wrong in which somebody died who was not supposed to and that he came to a culture which is dedicated to hand-to-hand combat and personal revenge allows Morton to truly critique modern Anglo-American masculinity, dedicated to adulterous debauchery. This also allows Morton to compare the masculinity of Ouâbi and Celario to the femininity of Azâkia. While the idea of revenge plays a large part in masculinity and it is an outward action that can be shown, the feminine aspect of melancholia is the exact opposite. It has no outward action. It produces strong mental hyperactivity. The opening scene generates the view that Azâkia is truly the one who suffers with and for the male characters. Women are expected to have this type of attitude. That they should mourn when men mourn and mourn for them even if they do not. This is also shown when Azâkia is contemplating suicide because Ouâbi killed himself for her. The idea of suicide comes from her dreams and fantasies that just are not real. “Her feelings have the same transparent integrity as theirs and her psychological life is far richer, but she is never instrumental”.

References

External links
 Digital copy of Ouâbi; or The Virtues of Nature (1790) at the Internet Archive

1790 poems
American poems
Poems about sexuality
Works about Native Americans